Daniel Algrant is an American filmmaker and writer. He co-wrote and directed Naked in New York (1993), a film produced by Martin Scorsese. Algrant was a repeat director for the television series Sex and The City and the director of films People I Know (2002) and Greetings from Tim Buckley (2012). Algrant is an alumnus of Harvard University and the Columbia University Film school.

Career

Algrant's first feature film, Naked in New York (1993) was executive produced by Martin Scorsese and premiered at the Sundance Film Festival. It won the Critic's Prize at the Deauville American Film Festival and competed at the Tokyo International Film Festival.

Algrant directed People I Know (2002), starring Al Pacino.

How To Grow A Band (2011) is a documentary executive produced by Algrant about the early days of American progressive bluegrass band Punch Brothers.

Algrant directed episodes of the sitcom Sex and The City (1999–2000).

He appears in an uncredited role as author Kelvin Kranz in the 2020 Steven Soderbergh film   Let Them All Talk.

References

External links
 

Living people
American film directors
Year of birth missing (living people)
Place of birth missing (living people)
Columbia University School of the Arts alumni
Harvard College alumni